The 2019 World Jigsaw Puzzle Championship is the first edition of the World Jigsaw Puzzle Championships competition organized by the World Jigsaw Puzzle Federation (WJPF).  It was held between 28 and 29 September in Valladolid, Spain.

Organisation
The venue for this first World Jigsaw Puzzle Championship was the Cúpula del Milenio.

The Championship included three events: team, pairs, and individual.

For the Team event, teams of 4 members (also 1 reserve is allowed) make 4 jigsaw puzzles (2 puzzles of 1000 pieces and 2 puzzles of 1500 pieces) in a maximum period of 8 hours, and the fastest team to finish them is the champion. The four members have to do one puzzle and when they finished it they can start the next puzzle.

For the Pairs event, 2 members make a jigsaw puzzles of 500 pieces in the maximum period of 90 minutes, and the fastest pair to finish it win the competition.

For the Individual event, each individual participant make a jigsaw puzzles of 500 pieces in the maximum period of 2 hours, and the fastest to finish it is the champion.

Results

Medal table

Participants 
40 countries are represented in the first World Jigsaw Puzzle Championship.

 Andorra
 Argentina
 Australia
 Belarus
 Belgium
 Brazil
 Bulgaria
 Canada
 Chile
 China
 Colombia
 Costa Rica
 Croatia
 Czech Republic
 France
 Germany
 Great Britain
 Greece
 India
 Ireland
 Israel
 Italy
 Japan
 Mexico
 Netherlands
 Norway
 Panama
 Peru
 Poland
 Portugal
 Russia
 Singapore
 South Korea
 Spain
 Trinidad & Tobago
 Turkey
 Uganda
 United States
 Uruguay
 Vietnam

References

Jigsaw puzzles
World championships